Måløy is a town in the municipality of Kinn in Vestland county, Norway. The Måløy Bridge connects the town centre to the area of Deknepollen on the mainland. Sør-Vågsøy Church is located in Måløy.

Måløy is one of the most important fishing ports in Norway. In 1997, Måløy was granted town status by the municipality. Prior to 2020, the town was also the administrative centre of the old Vågsøy Municipality.

History

Måløy was founded as a trading center on the small island of Moldøen, or Måløya, on the Ulvesundet strait between Vågsøy island and the mainland. As trade flourished, the town gradually moved to the larger island of Vågsøy, while keeping the name of the smaller island. This is the cause of some confusion, although the smaller island is today often known as "Lisje-Måløyna" (literally smaller Måløy) or "Øyna" (literally the island). During World War II, it was used as a German coastal fortress, which led to the eradication of all settlement on the island to make room for the fortress, and as a result of Operation Archery in December 1941.

Måløy was the administrative centre of the old municipality of Sør-Vågsøy which existed from 1910 until 1964, and it was then made the administrative centre of the new Vågsøy municipality which was created in 1964. In 2020, Vågsøy was merged with Flora Municipality to form the new Kinn Municipality. At that time, Måløy lost its administrative centre status.

Townscape
The town square in Måløy has a monument remembering the citizens of Sør-Vågsøy and Davik municipalities who died in World War II. Another monument, located elsewhere in the town, is a memorial to Martin Linge, the only Norwegian who died during Operation Archery. Few streets in Måløy are named; most, especially the ones on the hillside, are only numbered.

Culture
The festival Måløydagene is arranged in the town every year. In 2004, Måløy was awarded the role as a 2008 Tall Ships' Races main port. The town was the host of the participating tall ships from July 28 until August 4. The town offered great hospitality and welcomed crews warmly. The town, with STI had organized much in the way of crew activities.

Education
The only upper secondary school in the municipality, Måløy vidaregåande skule, as well as several lower secondary schools and elementary schools, are located in the vicinity of the town. The closest institutions of higher education are Sogn og Fjordane University College, located in Sogndal, Førde, and Sandane, Ålesund University College in Ålesund, and the University of Bergen in Bergen.

Sports
The association football club Tornado Måløy FK is the result of a merger between the independent clubs Tornado and Måløy in 2002. The club has two stadiums, one of which is located in Måløy, the other is in Refvika. The club's two men's senior teams play in the Norwegian third division and fifth division as of 2008.

International relations
Måløy has a friendship agreement with the following "twin" towns:
 Lerwick, Shetland, Scotland

See also
List of towns and cities in Norway
Nordfjord Folkeblad (1933–1952) newspaper

References

External links

Tall Ship's Race in Måløy

Kinn
Cities and towns in Norway
Populated places in Vestland
Port cities and towns of the North Sea
1997 establishments in Norway